Belgium will compete at the 2014 Summer Youth Olympics, in Nanjing, China from 16 August to 28 August 2014.

Medalists

Archery

Belgium qualified a male archer from its performance at the 2013 World Archery Youth Championships.

Individual

Team

Athletics

Belgium qualified four athletes.

Qualification Legend: Q=Final A (medal); qB=Final B (non-medal); qC=Final C (non-medal); qD=Final D (non-medal); qE=Final E (non-medal)

Girls
Track & road events

Field events

Basketball

Belgium qualified a girls' team based on the 1 June 2014 FIBA 3x3 National Federation Rankings.

Skills Competition

Girls' Tournament

Roster
 Fauve Bastiaenssen
 Eline Maesschalck
 Laeticia Mpoyi Wa Mpoyi
 Aline Verelst

Group Stage

Round of 16

Quarterfinals

Knockout Stage

Cycling

Belgium qualified a boys' and girls' team based on its ranking issued by the UCI.

Team

Mixed Relay

Golf

Belgium qualified one team of two athletes based on the 8 June 2014 IGF Combined World Amateur Golf Rankings.

Individual

Team

Gymnastics

Artistic Gymnastics

Belgium qualified one athlete based on its performance at the 2014 European MAG Championships

Boys

Judo

Belgium qualified two athletes based on its performance at the 2013 Cadet World Judo Championships.

Individual

Team

Rowing

Belgium qualified one boat based on reallocation of unused quotas.

Qualification Legend: FA=Final A (medal); FB=Final B (non-medal); FC=Final C (non-medal); FD=Final D (non-medal); SA/B=Semifinals A/B; SC/D=Semifinals C/D; R=Repechage

Swimming

Belgium qualified four swimmers.

Boys

Girls

Mixed

Table Tennis

Belgium qualified two athletes based on its performance at two Road to Nanjing series.

Singles

Team

Qualification Legend: Q=Main Bracket (medal); qB=Consolation Bracket (non-medal)

Taekwondo

Belgium qualified four athletes based on its performance at the Taekwondo Qualification Tournament.

Boys

Girls

Tennis

Belgium qualified two athletes based on the 9 June 2014 ITF World Junior Rankings.

Singles

Doubles

Triathlon

Belgium qualified two athletes based on its performance at the 2014 European Youth Olympic Games Qualifier.

Individual

Relay

References

2014 in Belgian sport
Nations at the 2014 Summer Youth Olympics
Belgium at the Youth Olympics